The Charlevoix City Park Site is an archaeological site located between Bridge Street and Round Lake in Charlevoix, Michigan. It was listed on the National Register of Historic Places in 1972.

The site is a Woodland period occupation, approximately AD 1000 - AD 1300.

References

National Register of Historic Places in Charlevoix County, Michigan
Archaeological sites on the National Register of Historic Places in Michigan